The 1994–95 Slovenian PrvaLiga season started on 7 August 1994 and ended on 31 May 1995. Each team played a total of 30 matches.

League table

Relegation play-offs

First round

Second round

Izola and Primorje won a place in Slovenian PrvaLiga

Results

Top goalscorers

See also
1994–95 Slovenian Football Cup
1994–95 Slovenian Second League

References
General

External links
Official website of the PrvaLiga 

Slovenian PrvaLiga seasons
Slovenia
1994–95 in Slovenian football